Quararibea cordata, the South American sapote or chupa-chupa, is a large, semi-deciduous, fruit tree (up to 45m in height), native to Amazon rainforest vegetation in Brazil, Colombia, Ecuador, and Peru. It bears orange-yellow fruit which are soft, juicy, sweet and contain 2-5 seeds. Fruit is usually eaten out of hand, though it may be juiced.

Although generally popular, the fruit is variable in quality, with some trees producing insipid or fibrous fruits and little work has been done in establishing preferred cultivars. It grows best in wet, deep soils, but can be killed by floods.

Distribution
Quararibea cordata is native to the foothills of the Andes, and is common throughout parts of Brazil, Venezuela, and Colombia, as well as rural southern Panama. However, it is not widely cultivated.

Chupa-chupa has failed to gain much international recognition and has not been widely planted outside its native range. In 1964, US pomologist Bill Whitman obtained seeds from Peru and planted a tree in his garden at Bal Harbour, Florida, where it has successfully fruited.

References

External links
CIRAD-FLHOR/IPGRI: Matisia cordata
 Morton, Julia F., 1987. Chupa-chupa. p. 291–292. In: Fruits of warm climates. Julia F. Morton, Miami, FL.

cordata
Trees of the Amazon
Tropical fruit
Trees of Brazil
Trees of Colombia
Trees of Ecuador
Trees of Peru
Crops originating from the Americas
Crops originating from Brazil
Crops originating from Peru
Crops originating from Colombia
Crops originating from Ecuador
Flora of the Amazon
Taxa named by Aimé Bonpland